Agatu, or North Idoma, is an Idomoid language of Nigeria.

References

Idomoid languages